Environmental Health Perspectives (EHP) is a peer-reviewed open access journal published monthly with support from the U.S. National Institute of Environmental Health Sciences (NIEHS). The primary purposes of EHP are to communicate recent scientific findings and trends in the environmental health sciences; to improve the environmental health knowledge base among researchers, administrators, and policy makers; and to inform the public about important topics in environmental health.

References

Environmental social science journals
Publications established in 1972
Monthly journals
English-language journals
Open access journals
Environmental health journals
Academic journals published by the United States government